Baraftab-e Bi (also Romanized as Barāftāb-e Bī; also known as Barāftāb-e Bagī and Barāftāb-e Beygī) is a village in Bijnavand Rural District, in the Zagros District of Chardavol County, Ilam Province, Iran. At the 2006 census, its population was 524, in 110 families. The village is populated by Kurds.

References 

Populated places in Chardavol County
Kurdish settlements in Ilam Province